The 1945 Keesler Field Fliers football team represented Keesler Field during the 1945 college football season. Led by head coach James Coffis, the Fliers compiled a 3–6–1 record.

Schedule

References

Keesler Field
Keesler Field Fliers football seasons
Keesler Field Fliers football